The Bangkok City Library is a public library in Bangkok, Thailand. It is on Ratchadamnoen Klang Road at the Khok Wua Intersection in Phra Nakhon District. It opened in April 2017, four years after Bangkok was named the UNESCO World Book Capital in 2013.

The "Bangkok City Library" occupies 4,789 m2 spread over four floors.

References

Libraries in Thailand
Buildings and structures in Bangkok